Jamasp (also spelled Zamasp) was a 6th-century Sasanian prince, who was the second oldest son of the incumbent king (shah) Kavad I. Jamasp was greatly admired for his ability in war, but was disqualified from succession due to have having lost an eye. The following year after the accession of his brother Khosrow I, Bawi along with other members of the Iranian aristocracy, became involved in a conspiracy in which they tried to overthrow Khosrow and make Jamasp's son Kavad the new shah, so Jamasp could rule as regent. The conspiracy, however, was revealed and Jamasp was murdered.

References

Sources 
  

 

532 deaths
Sasanian princes
People executed by the Sasanian Empire
6th-century Iranian people